World War II Veteran's Memorial Bridge is a twin-span  bridge which carries State Route 288 across the James River between Powhatan County and Goochland County in Virginia. State Route 288 forms a semi-circumferential beltway around the southwestern quadrant of the Richmond metropolitan area connecting with Interstate 95 on the southern end and Interstate 64 on the northern end.

The Virginia General Assembly proposed and passed the naming of the World War II Veteran's Memorial Bridge in 2003.  The Bridge was completed in 2004, and is owned by the Virginia Department of Transportation (VDOT).

References

External links
Route VA-288 Construction - Western Section (Roads to the Future)

Bridges completed in 2004
Bridges over the James River (Virginia)
Buildings and structures in Powhatan County, Virginia
Buildings and structures in Goochland County, Virginia
Transportation in Powhatan County, Virginia
Transportation in Goochland County, Virginia
Monuments and memorials in Virginia
World War II memorials in the United States
Road bridges in Virginia